Sir Henry Bellingham, 1st Baronet (d. October 1650) was an English lawyer and politician who sat in the House of Commons from 1625 to 1626. He supported the Royalist cause in the English Civil War.

Bellingham was the son of Sir James Bellingham and his wife Agnes Curwen, daughter of Sir Henry Curwen. He was educated at Queens' College, Cambridge in 1609, and admitted to the Middle Temple a year later. On 30 May 1620, he was created a baronet, of Hilsington, in the County of Westmorland by King James I of England. He was a member of parliament (MP) for Westmorland from 1625 until 1626 and again in the Long Parliament from 1640 until 1645.

Bellingham married Dorothy Boynton, daughter of Sir Francis Boynton. They had seven children, three surviving daughters and a son, James, who succeeded in the baronetcy, but died two weeks after his father.

References

1650 deaths
Baronets in the Baronetage of England
Cavaliers
Members of the Middle Temple
Year of birth missing
17th-century English lawyers
English lawyers
English MPs 1625
English MPs 1626
English MPs 1640–1648
Alumni of Queens' College, Cambridge